The Bazigar, Goaar, or Guar, language is spoken by the Bazigar ethnic group of north-western India who are found primarily in Punjab, but also in Haryana, Uttar Pradesh, Delhi, Chandigarh, Himachal Pradesh, Jammu and Kashmir and Rajasthan.

It is apparently an Indo-Aryan language, even though Ethnologue classifies it as Dravidian, and Glottolog has labelled it "unclassifiable". Schreffler argues that it compares well with the Western Rajasthani dialects as well as with Punjabi (with which it is not mutually intelligible), while Deb notes its resemblance to Bagri.

Background 
The Bazigar claim descent from the Rajputs of Rajasthan and relate how they started spreading around the end of the 18th century. 
Initially nomadic and with a traditional occupation involving acrobatics and performance arts, they are now largely settled and mostly engaged in agricultural and other forms of labour. Several of the major Bazigar groups currently found in Indian Punjab migrated at the time of Partition in 1947 from Western Punjab (now in Pakistan), where they had started settling earlier in the century.

The ethnic Bazigar are estimated at half a million in Punjab, but the language is not spoken by all. The younger generation are shifting to the regional languages, for example Schreffler reports that people younger than 30 prefer to use the regional language with one another, and speak Bazigar only with older people.

The language is also known as Guar boli, or goāroṅ ri bolī "Guars' speech", after the name that the community uses for itself. Bazigar has no written literature.

Additionally, the Bazigar have an artificial secret language which they use when they do not want to be understood by outsiders. They call it Parsi or Pashto (not to be confused with the Farsi and Pashto languages).

Linguistic characteristics 
Bazigar has an almost identical phonology to Punjabi except for the presence of the voiceless palatal fricative  and the absence of the voiceless glottal fricative . Words with initial  in Punjabi correspond to words with a tone in Bazigar. There are differences from Punjabi in the vocabulary and the morphology, notably in the absence of a vowel feminine ending (e.g.  'old woman'), and there are similarities to Hindi and Western Rajasthani, for example the 
genitive marker  and the dative marker .

See also 
 Lambadi language, spoken by the Banjara

References

Bibliography

Further reading 

 Christian evangelistic audio materials in Bazigar: Good News and Words of Life

Unclassified Indo-Aryan languages
Languages of India